, better known by his stage name  is a Japanese impressionist from Kanagawa Prefecture. His son, Ryūji Aoki, is also an impressionist.

Impression repertoire
Eun-sook Kye
Keiko Fuji
Akira Fuse
Hiromi Go
Shinji Harada
Takao Horiuchi
Takashi Hosokawa
Kōshi Inaba
Michael Jackson
Ryūichi Kawamura
Yuki Katsuragi
Saburō Kitajima
Keisuke Kuwata
Nobuteru Maeda
Chiharu Matsuyama
Yoshikazu Mera
Hibari Misora
Yoshinori Monta
Shinichi Mori
Yoshizaki Musshu
Tsuyoshi Nagabuchi
Kaname Nemoto
Tomotaka Okamoto
Judy Ongg
Masashi Sada
Hideki Saijō
Kenji Sawada
Eiko Segawa
Masanori Sera
Kiyomi Suzuki
Toshihiko Tahara
Kōji Tamaki
Masakazu Tamura
Shinji Tanimura
Yoshimi Tendō
Hideaki Tokunaga
Machiko Watanabe
Masayoshi Yamazaki

External links
Home page

1959 births
Japanese impressionists (entertainers)
Living people
People from Kanagawa Prefecture